The Castle Eden Railway was a railway line built by the North Eastern Railway between Bowesfield Junction near Stockton-on-Tees and Wingate, County Durham, Northeast England. Although its route actually never went near Castle Eden, it was also informally known as the "Cuckoo Line".

Authorisation
Passed under an Act of Parliament as the Stockton and Castle Eden Bridge Railway, it was built by contractor Thomas Nelson. The main civil engineering structure was the viaduct at Thorpe Thewles to cross Thorpe Beck and its valley, which consisted of 22 arches, used 8 million bricks and cost £37,000.

Opening
The first section of the line was opened on 1 May 1877 between Bowesfield Junction to Carlton South Junction (later ), with a curve to Carlton West, to give access to the coalfields of South County Durham. A curve connecting the line with the Leeds Northern Railway between Bowesfield Junction and Hartburn West Junction was added in 1901.

Electrification
During the 1920s the coal traffic declined, and some of the Electric Freight 1 locomotives became surplus to requirements. After the NER was grouped in 1923 as part of the London and North Eastern Railway, by the 1935 the LNER had replaced the electric locomotives with steam. A curve connecting with the Leeds Northern Railway between Bowesfield Junction and Hartburn West Junction was added in 1901.

Traffic
Originally proposed as a secondary mainline, it mainly carried freight, including: Weardale limestone; West County Durham coal; and Cleveland ironstone to support the growing industrialisation on Teesside. Its secondary transport was the shipment of agricultural supplies in and produce/livestock out from the valleys farms.

Decline and closure
In 1931 it lost its passenger services, and it closed to freight services in 1951. Its final demise even as a bypass route occurred as a result of the Beeching Axe review, closing in stages between 1966 and 1968. The track, ballast and other equipment were all removed by contractors soon afterwards.

The site today
In 1977 part of the line was acquired by Cleveland County Council with financial help from the Department of the Environment and the Countryside Commission. In 1979 the viaduct was demolished to make the Thorpe Thewles bypass. The residual section reopened to the public as the Castle Eden Walkway in 1981, while the old stationmasters house at Thorpe Thewles was opened as a Visitor Centre in 1983.

References

External links
History of the line @ Wynward Wood Land Park

Railway lines opened in 1877
Railway lines closed in 1968
North Eastern Railway (UK)
Closed railway lines in North East England
1877 establishments in England